Football captains may refer to:

 Captain (association football), a team captain of an association football team
 National Football League team captains, a team captain in a National Football League team